Hermann Manfred Georg Freiherr von Richthofen, GCVO (20 November 1933 in Breslau – 17 July 2021 in Berlin) was a German diplomat. He was a great nephew of Manfred von Richthofen, the "Red Baron".

He was ambassador to the United Kingdom from 1989 to 1993, and his name and relation to the Red Baron (see Richthofen family) made him a media favourite. He was later permanent representative of Germany to NATO from 1993 to 1998.

Hermann von Richthofen was married and had three children with his wife.

Hermann Freiherr von Richthofen was awarded an honorary LLD by Birmingham University in 2000.

Career history
 1955-58: Studied law at the Universities in Heidelberg, Munich and Bonn
 1958: First law degree
 1963: Second law degree
 1963: Dr. Jur. (PhD Law). Joined German diplomatic service on graduation
 1965-66: Federal German Foreign Office Desk Officer in Legal Directorate-General
 1966-68: Embassy Saigon Desk Officer for Humanitarian Aid
 1968-70: Embassy Jakarta Labour Attaché and Desk Officer in Legal and Consular Section and Political Section
 1970-74: Federal Foreign Office Desk Officer in Legal Directorate-General
 1974: Deputy Head of Section for International Law
 1975-78: Federal Chancellery Head of Section in Political Department of the Permanent Mission of the Federal Republic of Germany in Berlin (East)
 1978-80: Federal Foreign Office Head of Department in Political Directorate-General
 1980-86: Federal Chancellery Head of Working Unit "Deutschland-Politik"
 1986: Federal Foreign Office Deputy Under Secretary, Director-General for Legal Affairs and Special Adviser on International Law
 1986-1988: Federal Foreign Office Deputy Under Secretary (Political Director)
 1989-1993: Ambassador of the Federal Republic of Germany to the Court of St. James's
 1993-1998: permanent representative of Germany to NATO, Brussels

Notes

References

External links
 Nato's Who's Who Reference
 Interview with Hermann v. Richthofen

1933 births
2021 deaths
Barons of Germany
Hermann von Richthofen
People from Wrocław
People from the Province of Lower Silesia
Ambassadors of Germany to the United Kingdom
Permanent Representatives of Germany to NATO
Commanders Crosses of the Order of Merit of the Federal Republic of Germany
Honorary Knights Grand Cross of the Royal Victorian Order